The Goetsch–Winckler House (also known as Goetsch–Winkler House) is a building that was designed by Frank Lloyd Wright, built in 1940. It is located at 2410 Hulett Road, Okemos, Michigan. The house is an example of Wright's later Usonian architectural style, and it is considered to be one of the most elegant. The house was added to the National Register of Historic Places in 1995 and is #95001423.

History 

In the 1930s eight professors from Michigan State University in East Lansing, Michigan, formed a co-op and bought a  tract of land in neighboring Okemos. Two of them, Alma Goetsch and Kathrine Winckler (or Winkler), approached Wright asking him to design a community for them. Wright's concept, derived from the Broadacre City plan, was to be known as Usonia I. The community was to consist of seven houses and a caretaker's cottage surrounding a common farm, orchard, and fish pond. Access to the houses was by a U-shaped road around the farm, with each house at the end of a long driveway and each with a private garden. Although the design of each house varied, they did share common features such as flat roofs, accentuated horizontal lines, and simple massing. Due to lack of financing, the project collapsed, and only the Goetsch–Winckler House was built on a different site.

After World War II, Wright designed houses separately for several other co-op members, although the only design that was built was for Erling P. Brauner, also in Okemos, less than a mile and a half from Goetsch–Winckler House.

Design 

One of Wright's earliest Usonian homes, at  the house is an "in-line Usonian", literally a house built in a straight line. The carport, living room, dining room, kitchen and bedrooms all form rectangular spaces that slide past each other. The living room takes up most of the house, with a chimney at one end in front of a workspace. At the opposite end, two bedrooms, separated by a bathroom, open out on to a veranda. The workspace exemplifies the Usonian interior, with its clerestory windows supplementing a bank of full length casement windows on the adjacent wall. Despite its small size the house seems large due to built-in furniture and shelves. Built-ins include the dining room table, a seat by the fireplace, a bar, a desk and bookcase in the workspace, as well as numerous storage spaces.

See also 

The Acres – Galesburg Country Homes
Usonia Homes
Suntop Homes

References

Storrer, William Allin. The Frank Lloyd Wright Companion. University Of Chicago Press, 2006,  (S.269)

External links

Goetsch-Winckler House at PeterBeers.net
Escape to Usonia: Reflections on life in a Usonian home, blog by one of the homeowners

National Register of Historic Places in Ingham County, Michigan
Houses completed in 1940
Frank Lloyd Wright buildings
Houses in Ingham County, Michigan
1940 establishments in Michigan